Toototobi River is a river in the Amazon Rainforest of Amazonas, Brazil.  It is a tributary of the upper Rio Demini near the headwaters of the Orinoco.

The river flows through the territory of Kopenawa near the border of Venezuela.  The so-called "Toototobi Yanomami índios" take their name from this river.  Davi Kopenawa Yanomami, a shaman and Portuguese-speaking spokesperson of that tribal group, was born close to it.  The area may be a starting point for the epidemics of measles and other diseases which decimated the local peoples starting in the 1970s.

References
 "Engagement of anthropologists in public dialogue with members of study communities", University of Arizona
 Report of the Medical Team of the Federal University of Rio de Janeiro on Accusations Contained in Patrick Tierney's Darkness in El Dorado
 When Did the Measles Epidemic Begin among the Yanomami?

Toototobi